Mohammad Yasin MP ((born 10 October 1971) is a British-Pakistani Labour Party politician serving as the Member of Parliament (MP) for Bedford since 2017. He served as a Bedford Borough Councillor from 2006 to 2019, and was employed as a taxi driver prior to his election to Parliament.

Early life
Yasin was born on 10 October 1971 in Mirpur, Pakistan. His father was a truck driver. He obtained a Bachelor of Commerce degree from Degree College Mirpur. Yasin moved to Bedford, Bedfordshire at the age of 21. He reports that his first job on arrival was in a factory before becoming a taxi driver. While working at the factory, he became involved with trade unions, and joined the Labour Party.

In 2006, he was elected as a councillor for Queen's Park ward in Bedford Borough Council. Yasin was re-elected in 2009 and 2015. Upon being elected to Parliament, he continued to serve as a Bedford Borough Councillor until the 2019 local elections where he stood down. He was the Portfolio Holder on the council for Adult Services.

Parliamentary career
Yasin was elected as MP for Bedford in the 2017 general election with a majority of 789 (1.6%) votes. It was previously represented in parliament by Conservative Richard Fuller since 2010. In March 2018, Yasin received a suspicious package containing an Islamophobic letter and sticky liquid. The substance was later found to be harmless. Similar packages were received by fellow Muslim Labour MPs Rushanara Ali, Afzal Khan and Rupa Huq.

Yasin supported the UK remaining within the European Union (EU) in the 2016 UK EU membership referendum. In the indicative votes on 27 March 2019, Yasin voted for a referendum on a Brexit withdrawal agreement, for the Norway-plus model, and for a customs union with the EU.

Since May 2019, Yasin has sat on the Levelling Up, Housing and Communities Committee.

In the 2019 general election, Yasin was re-elected as MP for Bedford. He  defeated his closest Conservative challenger, Ryan Henson, by a margin of 145 votes (0.3%), making Bedford the most marginal Labour seat in the country.

Personal life
Yasin is married and is the father of four children.

References

External links
 

1971 births
Living people
British politicians of Pakistani descent
Councillors in Bedfordshire
English people of Mirpuri descent
Labour Party (UK) councillors
Labour Party (UK) MPs for English constituencies
Naturalised citizens of the United Kingdom
Pakistani emigrants to the United Kingdom
UK MPs 2017–2019
UK MPs 2019–present